Reinis Reinholds (born 26 September 1997) is a Latvian professional footballer who plays as a goalkeeper.

Club career

Youth years
Reinholds spent his teenage years in the FK Ventspils academy, playing mainly with the under-17 and under-19 teams. He also made five appearances with the reserve squad, Ventspils-2, in the second-tier First League during the 2013 season, as well as one lone appearance with the first team, coming on as a late-match replacement keeper for Maksims Uvarenko, who was sent off during a Latvian Higher League fixture against Skonto on 18 June 2014.

After trialling with Birmingham City, he was discovered by an agent who, in the summer of 2014, helped him make the move to Italian club Latina, where he played Primavera (under-19) football during the 2014–15 season.

Professional career
In November 2015, Reinholds signed with Serie C club Padova. He failed to make a single appearance during the 2015–16 season, serving as the third-string keeper behind Alessandro Favaro and Lazar Petković.

In the summer of 2016, he signed with Serie D side Civitanovese. However, after making just one league appearance, he was released by the club that December.

Later that month, he returned to Serie C, signing with Racing Roma. At the age of 19, he finally made his professional debut on 23 December 2016, playing as the starting keeper in a 2–1 league defeat to Livorno. For the season, he kept four clean sheets in 19 league appearances as his team finished last in their group. The season was also marred with heavy links to English club Chelsea; scouts were watching his matches in February and he trialled at Cobham Training Centre in May.

However, in August, he signed a three-year contract with Serie C side Pisa. He spent the 2017–18 season as a third-string keeper, failing to come off the bench behind Lazar Petković and Matteo Voltolini. He next year, he was demoted to fourth-string, as he failed to make a single appearance on the bench while Pisa achieved promotion to Serie B.

On 21 August 2019, he was loaned to Cypriot club Pafos.

Honours

Club
Ventspils
 Virslīga: 2014

References

External links
 
 
 
 

Living people
1997 births
Latvian footballers
Latvian expatriate footballers
Association football goalkeepers
FK Ventspils players
Calcio Padova players
Civitanovese Calcio players
S.S. Racing Club Roma players
Pisa S.C. players
Pafos FC players
Latvian Higher League players
Serie C players
Serie D players
Latvian expatriate sportspeople in Italy
Expatriate footballers in Italy
Latvian expatriate sportspeople in Cyprus
Expatriate footballers in Cyprus
People from Ventspils